Ernie Jones may refer to:

Ernie Jones (Australian sportsman) (1869–1943), Australian cricketer and Australian rules footballer
Ernie Jones (wide receiver) (born 1964), American football player
Ernie Jones (defensive back) (born 1953), American football player
Ernie Jones (footballer, born 1920) (1920–2002), Welsh footballer
Ernie Jones (footballer, born 1919) (1919–2011), footballer for Chester City
Ernie Jones (golfer) (1932–2019), Irish golfer
Ernie Jones (politician) (1910–2005), Canadian politician

See also
Ernest Jones (disambiguation)